The Radium Dial Company was one of a few now defunct United States companies, along with the United States Radium Corporation, involved in the painting of clocks, watches and other instrument dials using radioluminescent paint containing radium. The resulting dials are now collectively known as radium dials. The luminous paint used on the dials contained a mixture of phosphor and radium, a product that the Radium Dial Company named Luna.  However, unlike the US Radium Corporation, Radium Dial Company was specifically set up to only paint dials, and no other radium processing took place at the premises.

History 
The Radium Dial Company was started in 1917 and was in full production of painted dials by 1918. The company was a division of the Standard Chemical Company based in the Marshall Field Annex building in Chicago. In 1920 the company relocated to Peru, Illinois to closer proximity to the clock manufacturer and major customer, Westclox.

By 1922 the company had moved to a former high school building in Ottawa, Illinois where it remained until the mid-1930s. At the highest point in production (around 1925), the Radium Dial Company employed around 1,000 young women who turned out around 4,300 dials each day.

The company was headed by Joseph A. Kelly Sr.. Kelly opened up a new corporation called Luminous Processes Inc. a few blocks away from the Radium Dial Company in Ottawa, Illinois shortly after closing down the Radium Dial Company. Luminous Processes Inc. continued producing fluorescent watch dials powered by radium radioactivity until 1978.

See also 
Radium Girls
Radium jaw
Radioluminescence

References 

 Radium in Humans: A review of US  Studies
 Petitioned Public Health Assessment, Ottawa Radiation Areas, Ottawa, LaSalle County, Illinois
  Film Festival; A View of the Radium Dial Horror

Nuclear safety and security
Radium
Radioactivity
American companies established in 1917
Manufacturing companies established in 1917
1917 establishments in Illinois
Defunct manufacturing companies based in Illinois